Thomas Radcliffe (died 1586), of Elstow, Bedfordshire, was an English Member of Parliament.

He was a Member (MP) of the Parliament of England for Portsmouth in 1584. He was the son of Humphrey Radcliffe and brother of Edward Radclyffe, 6th Earl of Sussex, both also MPs.

References

Year of birth missing
1586 deaths
14th-century English people
People from Bedfordshire
Members of the Parliament of England (pre-1707)
People of the Tudor period